The 1999 Tour of the Basque Country  (Spanish: Vuelta Ciclista al País Vasco) was the 39th edition of the Tour of the Basque Country cycle race and was held from 5 April to 9 April 1999. The race started in Tolosa and finished at Aia. The race was won by Laurent Jalabert of the ONCE team.

General classification

References

1999
Bas